"Trophies" is a song by Canadian rapper Drake. The song was produced by Hit-Boy, 40, Hagler and Rey Reel. The song was originally meant for Drake's third studio album Nothing Was the Same, however, it was cut off the final track listing. After Drake released the song himself in December 2013, it was later included on the Young Money Entertainment compilation Young Money: Rise of an Empire. On February 27, 2014, it was officially released as the album's second official single, credited as Young Money featuring Drake. It peaked at number 50 on the US Billboard Hot 100 chart.

The song heavily samples the track "The Big Country" by French composer Bernard Gérard. The instrumental version of the song is the opening theme to The Stephen A. Smith Show radio and television program on ESPN.

Background
The trailer that was released for Drake's third studio album, Nothing Was the Same (2013), featured a snippet of "Trophies" playing in the background, but the song did not make the final version of the album. After teasing its release over the following months, the song surfaced on the internet on December 30, 2013. Hit-Boy, the lead producer of the song, has said that he was more than frustrated with the track's rollout. Then saying, "But it’s love. I got respect for Drake. He knows what’s best for him. He’s been dictating his career since Day One."

Critical reception
The song received positive reviews from music critics. Entertainment Weekly praised it as a blustery, superstar moment. Sheldon Pearce of XXL called the song brilliant and boisterous. Writing for Now, Jordan Sowunmi said, the "stentorian hit" is "a reminder that Young Money boasts some of rap’s biggest crossover stars." David Jeffries of AllMusic said the song featured, "Drake stomping over Hit-Boy's Viking-worthy beat. A two-headed monster of a track that pits verses-filled Southern rap victory against an emo-rap chorus.

Commercial performance
As of May 18, 2014, the song has sold 406,272 copies in the United States according to Nielsen Soundscan. It has spent multiple weeks in the top ten of the US R&B/Hip-Hop Singles Sales chart.

Charts

Weekly charts

Year-end charts

Certifications

References

External links

2014 singles
2013 songs
Drake (musician) songs
Cash Money Records singles
Republic Records singles
Song recordings produced by Hit-Boy
Song recordings produced by 40 (record producer)
Songs written by Drake (musician)
Young Money Entertainment singles